Nat Panagarry (born 27 December 1990) is an English netballer who currently plays for Loughborough Lightning in the Netball Superleague in the United Kingdom. After a prolific season at the Lightning, Panagarry was selected in the England 12-player squad for the 2019 Netball World Cup.

References 

English netball players
Living people
Netball Superleague players
1990 births
People educated at Arnold School
Alumni of Leeds Beckett University
2019 Netball World Cup players
Loughborough Lightning netball players
Yorkshire Jets players